Al-Jame-atul Islamia is an Islamic seminary of Sunni-Barelvi Muslims in India. It is located in Raunahi, District. Faizabad, near Lucknow, in the north Indian state of Uttar Pradesh in India.

History
Al-Jame-atul-Islamia was founded in 1964 by Qamaruzzaman Azmi. Azmi was supported by a core team of key people such as Dr Syed Mahfoozur Rahman, Dr Syed Habibur Rahman, Syed Mohammed IlyasH, Alhaaj Shamiuallah Khan, Haji Sagir Ahmed Khan( Kolkata), Akhlaque Khana (Delhi), Mustaque Ahmad, Munne Khan, Itlafat Ahamd Khan, Mohammed Riyaz Khan and Waseem Ahmad and in 1974, Jalaluddin Quadri was appointed as Manager.
The degrees of Al-Jame-atul-Islamia are recognized by universities of India and abroad like:
 Al-Azhar University, Cairo, Egypt
 Aligarh Muslim University
 Jamia Millia Islamia, Delhi University
 Jawaharlal Nehru University.

Affiliation and Alumni
Al-Jame-atul-Islamia is affiliated to Al-Azhar University, Cairo, Egypt and some of the student graduates at Al-Azhar University include:
 Maulana Taj Muhammad Khan, Sultanpur, U.P. Graduated from Alazhar 2004
 Maulana Muhammad Ayub Qadri,Moradabad, U.P. Graduated from Alazhar 2008
 Maulana Muhammad Arkan Rizvi,J.P.Nagar, U.P. Graduated from Alazhar 2008
 Maulana Faheem Ahmad saqleni,Badaun, U.P. Graduated from Alazhar 2008
 Maulana Ataul Mustafa Qadri,Bareilly, U.P. Graduated from Alazhar 2008
 Maulana Sarfaraz Ahmad Meman,Surat Gujrat, Graduated from Alazhar 2008
 Maulana Mahmood Alam, Moradabad, U.P. Graduated from Alazhar at 2009, and doing Post Graduation from same Faculty.
 Maulana Abdul Moid, RaeBarielly, U.P. Graduated from Alazhar at 2009
 Maulana Ali Hasan Alvi, Bahraich, U.P. Graduated from Alazhar at 2009
 Maulana Ashfaq Husain,Gonda, U.P. Graduated from Alazhar at 2009
 Maulana Muhammad Ayub Khan,bahraich, U.P. Graduated from Alazhar at 2010
 Maulana aqeel Ahmad, balrampur, U.P. Graduated from Alazhar at 2010, completing MA at Alazhar.
 Maulna Abdul Mustafa, Balrampur, U.P Graduated from Alazhar at 2009.

Departments
The Jamia has following departments.
Primary Section
Department of Hifz
Department of Tajweed and Quirat
Department of Alia (up to M.A.Degree)
Interpretation of the Holy Quran
Department of preaching and propagation
Department of Ifta (religious decree)
Department of research & publication
Department of Journalism
Department of computer
Department of Arabic Literature

Some famous lecturers

 Mufti Shabeer Hasan Rizvi, Head of Islamic law and fatwa
 Maulana Muhammad Ayub Rizvi, Principal  
 Maulana Noman Khan, Previous Principal
 Maulana Vasi Ahamd Vasi Siddiqi, Vice Principal
 Muhammad Bakhshullah Qadri, Vice Head of Shaikhul Hadith
 Maulana Juned Ahmad Naim, Head of Arabi language and literature
 Maulana Shakir Husain
 Master Abdul Khaleeq Ahmad, Head of English department
 Hazarata Qari sartaj Ahmad, Head of Hifz Department
 Qari Abdul Lateef
 Maulana Gulam Murtaza
 Qari Ali Akbar
 Maulana Salman Khan Hindi
 Shabbeer Ahmad( Muballigh Saheb)
 maulana sharif misbahi azhari
 maulana aqil ahmad misbahi amjadi
 maulana nasir misbahi
 maulan azharuddin jamai

Students
In 2011 Al-Jamiatul Islamia witnessed four hundred Ulemas graduate at the hands of its founder  Muffakir-e-Islam Qamaruzzaman Azmi at the annual graduation ceremony. Many students of this institution are now working in different parts of the world in South Africa, UK, USA, Canada, Holland, Mauritius and the Middle East. Some of the famous students include the Mufti-e-Azam of America, Allama Mufti Qamar-ul-Hassan, the Chief Imam of Scotland's Khizra Mosque Allama Faroghul Quadri, Mufti Shamshul Huda in Dewsbury, UK, Dr Waqar Azmi OBE, UK Government's former Chief Diversity Adviser, Allama Abdul Mannan Jama'ee, Holland, Allama Khalid Razvi, Leicester, UK and Sayyad Moinuddin Ashraf (Moin Miya'n) Sajjada Nasheen, Kicchocha Sharif.

See also
Karwan-I-Islami
Islam in India
Jamiatur Raza
Al Jamiatul Ashrafia 
Manzar-e-Islam

Sources

Madrasas in India
Islamic universities and colleges in India
Universities and colleges in Uttar Pradesh
Faizabad district
Educational institutions established in 1964
1964 establishments in Uttar Pradesh
Barelvi Islamic universities and colleges